Tarapada Chakraborty (April 1, 1909 – September 1, 1975) was an Indian classical vocalist. He was born in Kotalipara, Faridpur, Bengal Presidency (now in Bangladesh) to a Vedic Brahmin family. He is known for the khyal and thumri forms of singing, as well as for his popular renditions of Raagpradhans. He is the pioneer of the Kotali Gharana which is best known for its slow rendition of alap while presenting a raga. He was the first Indian classical artiste to have presented any Raaga in 48-beats vilambit format, which is considered to be a difficult rendition in itself. He is the creator of Raaga Chhaya Hindol and Navamalaka.

In 1972, he was awarded the Sangeet Natak Akademi Fellowship the highest honour conferred by Sangeet Natak Akademi, India's National Academy for Music, Dance and Drama. He was the recipient of State Academy Award from Rabindra Bharati University in 1972.

References

External links 
 Tarapada Chakraborty
 HarmoNYom "A Voice for Indian Classical Music"
 Music of Bengal through the ages

1909 births
1975 deaths
20th-century Indian musicians
Indian classical musicians of Bengal
Bengali Hindus
Musicians from West Bengal
Recipients of the Sangeet Natak Akademi Fellowship